Sigamary Diarra (born 10 January 1984) is a retired Malian footballer who played as a midfielder.

Career
Diarra was born in Villepinte. Having started out at Caen in 2002–03, he took his first professional contract at Sochaux, where he received opportunities to play in Ligue 1 and the UEFA Cup.  After two years there, he returned to Ligue 2 with Laval, who promptly were relegated to the National.

In 2007, he signed for Tours, where he plays alongside Mali team mate, David Coulibaly and left on 27 June 2009 the club to sign with FC Lorient.

On 3 July 2012, Diarra moved to AC Ajaccio on a two-year deal.

In May 2019 Diarra announced, that he had retired from football after having been without club since his departure from Valenciennes in the summer 2018.

Honours
Mali
Africa Cup of Nations bronze: 2013

References

External links
 
 

1984 births
Living people
French footballers
Citizens of Mali through descent
Malian footballers
Mali international footballers
Association football midfielders
Ligue 1 players
Stade Malherbe Caen players
FC Sochaux-Montbéliard players
Stade Lavallois players
Tours FC players
FC Lorient players
AC Ajaccio players
Valenciennes FC players
French sportspeople of Malian descent
2013 Africa Cup of Nations players
2015 Africa Cup of Nations players